Sybilla of Normandy (c. 1092 – 12 or 13 July 1122) was Queen of Scotland as the wife of Alexander I.

Sybilla was the first child of Henry I of England and his mistress, Lady Sybilla Corbet of Alcester (b. 1077 in Alcester, Warwickshire, d. after 1157). Her maternal grandfather was Robert Corbet of Alcester, part of the Corbet family. She was born circa 1092 in Domfront, Normandy.

Around 1107, Sybilla married Alexander I, King of Scots. The marriage was childless. The marriage ceremony may have occurred as early as 1107, or as at late as 1114.

William of Malmesbury's account attacks Sybilla, but the evidence argues that Alexander and Sybilla were a devoted but childless couple and Sybilla was of noteworthy piety. Sybilla died in unrecorded circumstances at Eilean nam Ban (Kenmore on Loch Tay) in July 1122 and was buried at Dunfermline Abbey. Alexander did not remarry and Walter Bower wrote that he planned an Augustinian Priory at the Eilean nam Ban dedicated to Sybilla's memory, and he may have taken steps to have her venerated.

References 

1090s births
1122 deaths
House of Dunkeld
Illegitimate children of Henry I of England
House of Normandy
People from Orne
Scottish royal consorts
12th-century Scottish people
12th-century Scottish women
12th-century Norman women
Daughters of kings